Church of Lord may refer to:

 Bible Way Church of Our Lord Jesus Christ, two Pentecostal denominations which were originally one
 Church of Our Lord (Victoria, British Columbia), a Reformed Episcopal Church parish
 Church of Our Lord Jesus Christ of the Apostolic Faith, a Pentecostal denomination
 Church of Our Lord of Socorro, magnificent 18th century baroque style temple located in Labruja, Ponte de Lima
 Church of the Lord (Aladura), African Initiated Church
 Church of the Lord Jesus (Calcutta), Catholic church located at Taltala
 Church of the Lord Jesus Christ, church organization with its headquarters located in Philadelphia, Pennsylvania